Evgeny Ruman (born 1979) is an Israeli film director, editor and writer.

Evgeny Ruman was born in Minsk, Belarus. In 1990, immigrated to Israel with family. Graduated from Film & TV department in Tel-Aviv University. During the studies wrote and directed several short films, which won awards and participated in numerous international film festivals.

He is the creator, head scriptwriter and director of In Between the Lines, which is the first Russian language TV-series to be aired in Israel. He edited Five Hours from Paris which won Best Film at the Haifa Film Festival in 2009.

His debut feature film, Igor and the Cranes' Journey (2012), premiered at Toronto International Film Festival, and received awards at film festivals in Chicago, Haifa, and Minsk. His second feature film, The Man in the Wall (2015), premiered at Rotterdam International Film Festival. His third feature film Ruby Strangelove Young Witch was released later in 2015.

In 2013, Evgeny Ruman received the Excellence Award from the Israeli Culture and Sport Ministry for contribution to Israeli film.

In 2017, "The Damned", an Israeli horror film directed by Ruman, was released.

References

External links 

 
 Evgeny Ruman at the EDB.co.il

Israeli film directors
Israeli cinematographers
1979 births
Living people